Paul Stephen Rudd (born April 6, 1969) is an American actor. He studied theater at the University of Kansas and the American Academy of Dramatic Arts, before making his acting debut in 1991. He received a star on the Hollywood Walk of Fame in July 2015. He was included on the Forbes Celebrity 100 list in 2019. In 2021, he was named People magazine's "Sexiest Man Alive".

His films include Clueless (1995), Halloween: The Curse of Michael Myers (1995), Romeo + Juliet (1996), Wet Hot American Summer (2001), Anchorman: The Legend of Ron Burgundy (2004), The 40-Year-Old Virgin (2005), Knocked Up (2007),  I Love You Man (2009), This Is 40 (2012), and Ghostbusters: Afterlife (2021). He has played Ant-Man in the Marvel Cinematic Universe, beginning with Ant-Man (2015) and most recently appearing in Ant-Man and the Wasp: Quantumania (2023).

In addition to his film career, Rudd has appeared in numerous television shows, including the NBC sitcom Friends as Mike Hannigan, along with guest roles on Tim and Eric Awesome Show, Great Job!, Reno 911! and Parks and Recreation, and has also hosted Saturday Night Live multiple times. He starred in a dual role in the Netflix comedy series Living with Yourself, which earned him a Golden Globe Award nomination for Best Actor – Television Series Musical or Comedy. He starred in the miniseries The Shrink Next Door (2021).

Early life and education
Paul Stephen Rudd was born on April 6, 1969, in Passaic, New Jersey, to English-born Jewish parents. His father, Michael Rudd (1943–2008), was a historical tour guide and former vice-president of TWA. His mother, Gloria Irene Granville, was a sales manager at television station KSMO-TV in Kansas City, Missouri. His parents were both from London, with his father hailing from Edgware and his mother from Surbiton, and both were descended from Ashkenazi Jewish immigrants who moved to England from Belarus, Poland, and Russia. Rudd's paternal family's original surname, Rudnitsky, was changed by his grandfather to Rudd, and his maternal family's surname was originally Goldstein; his parents were second cousins. Rudd had a Bar Mitzvah service in Ontario, Canada. Growing up, he loved reading the British comics The Beano and The Dandy, which his uncle in the United Kingdom sent him.

When Rudd was ten, his family moved to Lenexa within Johnson County, Kansas. Because of his father's occupation, the family also spent three years in Anaheim, California. In Johnson County, Rudd attended Broadmoor Junior High and graduated from Shawnee Mission West High School in 1987. He attended the University of Kansas, where he majored in theater and belonged to the Sigma Nu fraternity's Nu Chapter. He studied at the American Academy of Dramatic Arts with fellow actor Matthew Lillard. He also spent three months studying Jacobean drama at the British American Drama Academy in Oxford. While attending acting school, he worked as a DJ at bar mitzvahs. After graduation, he worked a variety of odd jobs, including glazing hams at the Holiday Ham Company in Overland Park.

Career

Film and television

Rudd made his acting debut in 1991 where he starred in a Super Nintendo commercial. In 1992, he starred in the television drama Sisters, as Kirby Quimby Philby. In 1994, he appeared in Wild Oats for six episodes. He left Sisters in 1995 to appear in the comedy film Clueless with Alicia Silverstone. He also appeared in Halloween: The Curse of Michael Myers as Tommy Doyle, William Shakespeare's Romeo + Juliet, The Locusts, Overnight Delivery, The Object of My Affection, and 200 Cigarettes. He was in the cast of the 1999 film The Cider House Rules that received a SAG nomination for Outstanding Performance by a Cast in a Motion Picture.

He played FBI Agent Ian Curtis in Benny Chan's 2000 Hong Kong action film Gen-Y Cops. In 2002, he was cast on the sitcom Friends as Mike Hannigan, who dates and then marries Phoebe Buffay, played by Lisa Kudrow. In 2006, he appeared in several episodes of Reno 911! as "Guy Gerricault" (pronounced "jericho"), the coach of a lamaze class, and then portrayed a drug lord in the Reno 911!: Miami film. He guest-starred as a has-been 1990s rock star, Desmond Fellows, on the television series Veronica Mars, in the 2007 episode "Debasement Tapes".

The year 2004 marked the start of his work with director/producer Judd Apatow, first on the film Anchorman: The Legend of Ron Burgundy as Brian Fantana with Steve Carell, David Koechner and Will Ferrell, produced by Apatow and again in 2005 in The 40-Year-Old Virgin with Carell and Seth Rogen, directed by Apatow. He subsequently worked with Apatow in 2007's Knocked Up, as frustrated husband Pete, married to Leslie Mann's character. In that film, he co-starred with Jason Segel, Jonah Hill, Seth Rogen, and Jay Baruchel. He also was the narrator for the 2007 edition of the long-running sports documentary series Hard Knocks, as the team featured that season (the Kansas City Chiefs) was the team he supports. This was the only season not to feature the series' regular narrator, Liev Schreiber.

Rudd appeared as John Lennon in the comedy film Walk Hard: The Dewey Cox Story in 2007 and as the drug-addled surf instructor in Nicholas Stoller's Forgetting Sarah Marshall in 2008 with Jason Segel and Jonah Hill, both of which Apatow produced. Rudd appeared in uncredited cameos in Year one (2009) and Bridesmaids (2011). In 2012, he starred and also co-produced with Apatow on the film Wanderlust with Jennifer Aniston. He starred in the comedy film This Is 40 with Leslie Mann, a spinoff from Knocked Up, which was directed and produced by Apatow. He reprised his role as Brian Fantana in the 2013 sequel Anchorman 2: The Legend Continues.

In 2007, he starred in The Oh in Ohio and The Ten, which reunited him with David Wain and Michael Showalter, and then in Over Her Dead Body with Eva Longoria the next year. In his next comedy which he also wrote, Role Models, he and co-star Seann William Scott portray energy drink salesmen forced to perform community service in a child mentoring program.

In 2009, Rudd again appeared with Jason Segel in I Love You Man where he and Segel play buddies who bond over their shared love for the rock band Rush. Both Rudd and Segel are themselves fans of the band. Also in 2009, Rudd co-created the TV series Party Down with John Embom, Rob Thomas and Dan Etheridge. He lent his voice to the DreamWorks computer-animated movie Monsters Vs. Aliens.

In 2010, Rudd reunited with Steve Carell for the first time since The 40-Year-Old Virgin for the Jay Roach-directed comedy Dinner for Schmucks. In 2012, he had a supporting role in the drama The Perks of Being a Wallflower, playing Mr. Anderson, a teacher of Charlie, played by Logan Lerman. He starred in the 2011 comedy-drama film Our Idiot Brother with Elizabeth Banks, Zooey Deschanel, and Emily Mortimer. It was the fifth film that Rudd starred in with Elizabeth Banks. He had previously appeared with her in Wet Hot American Summer (2001), The Baxter (2005), The 40-Year-Old Virgin (2005) and Role Models (2008).

In 2012, Rudd signed to appear on four episodes of NBC's Parks and Recreation as Bobby Newport, a candidate for City Council and a rival of Amy Poehler's character Leslie Knope, a role for which he won the Critics' Choice Television Award for Best Guest Performer in a Comedy Series. In 2014, he began providing voiceovers for Hyundai television commercials. He has also voiced the audiobook recordings of John Hodgman's books The Areas of My Expertise (2005) and More Information Than You Require (2008).

On December 19, 2013, Rudd was officially confirmed as cast in the 2015 Marvel film Ant-Man. He played lead character Scott Lang/Ant-Man. Rudd reprised his role in Captain America: Civil War (2016) as well as Ant-Mans 2018 sequel, Ant-Man and the Wasp; he also co-wrote the latter. Rudd returned alongside Evangeline Lilly in Avengers: Endgame (2019), which received critical acclaim and went on to become the highest-grossing film of all time. He reprised his role in 2023 with Ant-Man and the Wasp: Quantumania.

Rudd reprised his role as Andy from Wet Hot American Summer in the Netflix prequel Wet Hot American Summer: First Day of Camp, alongside an ensemble cast including Bradley Cooper, Amy Poehler and Elizabeth Banks, all reprising their roles from the 2001 film. In 2016, he appeared in the comedy-drama film The Fundamentals of Caring, alongside Selena Gomez, and lent his voice to the animated films The Little Prince and Sausage Party. He also lent his voice to a struggling actor named John in the animated comedy film Nerdland (2016), alongside Patton Oswalt. 
Rudd was also cast as the lead in The Catcher Was a Spy (2018), playing Moe Berg, a catcher for the Boston Red Sox who joined the OSS during World War II.
In August 2018, Rudd was cast in Netflix's comedy series Living with Yourself, alongside Aisling Bea. He also executive produced the series, which premiered on October 18, 2019.

From 2004 until 2021, during all appearances on the late night comedy shows hosted by comedian Conan O'Brien, when promoting his projects Rudd would explain the clip that is about to be shown, but would then throw to a clip from the 1988 movie Mac and Me instead. Rudd  admitted that he "never imagined" that the running gag would last so long. "There's something so tricky about it. Cause here I am. I'm gonna sell my wares on TV. Like, 'Here's something from what I just filmed.' It just seemed—and still does to a large extent—kind of insincere," he said. Rudd continued the tradition by deceiving Conan with an audio version of the prank on a 2022 episode of the podcast Conan O'Brien Needs a Friend, "Paul Rudd Returns".

Theater
Rudd has also appeared in Broadway plays, the first being The Last Night of Ballyhoo as Joe Farkas in 1997. The next year he appeared in Twelfth Night with Kyra Sedgwick and Max Wright at the Lincoln Center Theatre. In 2006, he appeared in the Broadway production of Richard Greenberg's Three Days of Rain with Bradley Cooper and Julia Roberts at the Bernard Jacobs Theater. In 2012, Rudd appeared in the Broadway production of Craig Wright's Grace at the Cort Theatre. Starring alongside Rudd was Academy Award nominee Michael Shannon, Kate Arrington, and seven-time Emmy Award winner Ed Asner.

In 2000-2001, he appeared in a production of Long Day's Journey Into Night, along with Jessica Lange, Charles Dance, and Olivia Colman, at the Lyric Theatre, London. In 2001, he starred as "Adam"
in the original London production of Neil LaBute's The Shape of Things, and again Off-Broadway for three months starting in October 2001. Two years later, the film was made with all of the original cast.

Personal life
In 2003, Rudd married Julie Yaeger, whom he met (shortly after working on Clueless) in his publicist's office, where she worked. Yaeger has since become a screenwriter and producer. They live in Rhinebeck, New York, with their two children: son Jack Sullivan, born in 2006, and daughter Darby, born in 2010.

Rudd is a fan of MLB's Kansas City Royals, Kansas Jayhawks sports, and of the NFL's Kansas City Chiefs, for whom he narrated the 2007 season of HBO's Hard Knocks.

Rudd received a star on the Hollywood Walk of Fame on July 1, 2015. He unveiled the 2,554th star on the mile-long strip of plaques on Hollywood Boulevard. He said, "I remember being a kid and walking this boulevard and reading the names and thinking about what so many other millions of people thought about, which is, you know, 'Who's that?'"

Since 2014, Rudd and fellow actor Jeffrey Dean Morgan have been co-owners of Samuel's Sweet Shop, a candy store in Rhinebeck, New York that they saved from closing when the previous owner, a friend of theirs, died unexpectedly.

Philanthropy and advocacy 

Rudd is a supporter of the Stuttering Association for the Young (SAY), a nonprofit organization dedicated to helping young people who stutter. He hosted its 6th Annual All-Star Bowling Benefit on January 22, 2018. He told Vanity Fair that he became an advocate for stuttering awareness after portraying a character who stuttered in a play. He is also a founder of the charity The Big Slick, a celebrity sports event in Kansas City every June to support Kansas City's Children's Mercy Hospital.

Rudd was part of Seth Rogen's Hilarity for Charity, to increase awareness and investment in Alzheimer’s research.

Rudd also joined Fisher Stevens, Jennifer Aniston, Ben Stiller and others in writer-director Andres Useche's filmmaking efforts in support of marine life conservation.

Filmography and awards

References

External links

 
 
 

1969 births
Living people
20th-century American male actors
21st-century American male actors
Actors from the New York metropolitan area
Alumni of the British American Drama Academy
American Academy of Dramatic Arts alumni
American male film actors
American male screenwriters
American male stage actors
American male television actors
American male voice actors
American people of English-Jewish descent
American people of Polish-Jewish descent
American people of Russian-Jewish descent
Jewish American male actors
Jewish American writers
Male actors from Kansas
Male actors from New Jersey
People from Lenexa, Kansas
People from Overland Park, Kansas
People from Passaic, New Jersey
Screenwriters from Kansas
Screenwriters from New Jersey
University of Kansas alumni
21st-century American Jews
Frat Pack